Witchfynde are an English heavy metal band, forerunners of the new wave of British heavy metal in the late 1970s.

History

Early days 
Witchfynde were formed in Derbyshire, England, in 1974, by bass guitarist Richard Blower and vocalist Neil Harvey. Richard Blower discovered Montalo (Trevor Taylor) in a band called Atiofel. When Richard left the band in 1975, they reformed Witchfynde with lead guitarist Montalo, bassist Andro Coulton and drummer Gra Scoresby, and soon recruiting vocalist Steve Bridges. The band released their first single, "Give 'Em Hell" in 1979 and released its first full-length album, also entitled Give 'Em Hell, on Rondelet Records in 1980. A major attribute to success may have originated by the frequent airplay on the Friday Rock Show, hosted by Tommy Vance on BBC Radio 1. The band gained some exposure by touring the United Kingdom with Def Leppard in the summer of 1980. The band's sound incorporated a mix of influences, such as doom, progressive and hard rock, with various aspects of the heavy metal sound as well as prominent use of satanic imagery.

Second album and change of musical direction 
In 1980, the band released their second album Stagefright. Like their debut, it was recorded at Fairview Studios in Willerby, East Riding of Yorkshire, and is considered their most experimental work to date. During the period the album was released, bassist Andro Coulton was replaced by Pete Surgey.

Departure from Rondelet Records 
Around the time of the band's second release, the relationship with their label Rondelet Records became increasingly strained, to the point where the label withdrew the band's funding. This made things very difficult for Witchfynde and eventually led to the departure of vocalist Steve Bridges. The band then recruited new singer Luther Beltz and began working on third album Cloak and Dagger; it was released on the small label Expulsion Records, but owing to bad production and the fact the label went bankrupt shortly after the album's release, it did not receive good promotion.

Mausoleum Records, fourth album and split 
The band signed a deal in 1984 with Mausoleum Records to release their fourth album Lords of Sin. During the recording of the album, bassist Pete Surgey left the band and was replaced by Edd Wolfe, who had played in one of Luther Beltz's former bands; however, by the time the album was released he was replaced by Al Short, who played in the band Race Against Time. Although the band considered the album their strongest to date, it received very bad reviews from critics, with the final blow delivered when Mausoleum Records went bankrupt; as the result of the album's bad promotion, the band became totally disillusioned with the music business and split up.

Reunion, 1999–present 
In October 1999, Montalo, Gra and Luther began to discuss the possibility of a reunion, owing to a resurgence of interest in the band after the release of the Best of Witchfynde CD in 1996, which sold well. Pete Surgey rejoined the band on bass. However, during rehearsals Luther Beltz announced that he no longer wanted to participate in the reunion; the band replaced him with vocalist Harry Harrison, a longtime fan of the band that was introduced by Pete Surgey. The band then began to work on their fifth album The Witching Hour, which they released on Edgy Records in 2001.

Their first three albums were re-released by Cherry Red and Lemon Recordings. A new Best Of album was released in 2007 by Lemon Recordings.

The band then began work on their sixth studio album called Play It to Death, which they recorded at Bandwagon Studios and released in July 2008. Towards the end of 2008, owing to Harry Harrison's ill-health and other commitments, Luther Beltz returned to front the band for the Play It to Death UK Tour.

July 2014 saw the addition of second guitarist Tracey Abbott from Overdrive.

Witchfynde played one of its first shows at the Metalcova Festival in Spain Barcelona on 28 November 2015, and continued to tour up until 2020. Standout shows included the Alpine Steel Festival in Austria Innsbruck 2016, the HOAF Festival in Germany 2019, the Sweden Rock Festival 2019, and the very first Metal Conquest in Rome in January 2020.

2020 saw the last performance of the remaining original band members, Montalo (Trevor Taylor) and Gra Scoresby. The concert was at Newcastle’s famous rock bar, Trillions, and Luther Beltz retired soon after.

With the onset of the global pandemic and ill health within the group, the remaining band members decided to retire from all live performances.

The band stayed in close communication during the pandemic and continued to be active with the fans on social media; this led to long-standing guitarist Tracey Abbot and bassist Ian Hamilton joining forces and agreeing with the original band members that they would continue to keep the Witchfynde flame lit as Witchfynde X, touring the six studio albums that saw Witchfynde carve its place in Heavy Metal history.

Trevor Taylor (Montalo) and Gra Scoresby continue to work collaboratively on studio recordings for independent projects.

Line-up

Current
 Luther Beltz – lead vocals (1980–1986, 1999, 2008–retired 2021)
 Montalo (Trevor Taylor) – guitar (1973–1984, 1999–retired 2021)
 Ian Hamilton – bass guitar – (2017–Present Witchfynde-X)
 Gra Scoresby – drums and percussion (1973–1984, 1999–retired 2021)
 Tracey Abbott – guitar (2014–Present Witchfynde-X)

Former
 Steve Bridges (vocals)
 Andro Coulton (bass)
 Alan Edwards ("Edd Wolfe") (bass)
 Dave Lindley (drums)
 Ron Reynolds (guitars)
 Dave Hewitt (bass/vocals)
 Neil Harvey (vocals)
 Richard Blower (bass guitar)
 Tez Brown (drums)
 Harry Harrison (vocals)
 Pete Surgey (bass guitar)

Discography

Studio albums
 Give 'Em Hell (Rondelet, 1980; reissued by Lemon, 2004)
 Stagefright (Rondelet, 1980; reissued by Lemon, 2005)
 Cloak and Dagger (Expulsion, 1983; reissued by Witchfynde Music, 2000)
 Lords of Sin (Mausoleum, 1984; first 10,000 copies came with Anthems live EP)
 The Witching Hour (Neat, 2001)
 Play It to Death (Neat, 2008)

Live albums
 Royal William Live Sacrifice (Neat, 2011)

Compilation albums
 The Best of Witchfynde (British Steel, 1996)
 The Lost Tapes of 1975 (Vyper Records, 2013)

Singles
 "Give 'Em Hell" / "Gettin' Heavy" 7" (Rondelet, 1979)
 "In the Stars" / "Wake Up Screaming" 7" (Rondelet, 1980)
 "I'd Rather Go Wild" / "Cry Wolf" 7" (Expulsion, 1983)
 Anthems 12" (Mausoleum, 1984)
 "Conspiracy" / "Scarlet Lady" 7" (Mausoleum, 1984)

Wytchfynde
 Demo 2000
 The Awakening LP (Demolition, 2001)

See also
List of new wave of British heavy metal bands

References

External links
 Official Witchfynde-x website
 [ Allmusic Witchfynde biography]
 Witchfynde @ Lemon Recordings

English heavy metal musical groups
Musical groups established in 1973
Musical groups disestablished in 1984
Musical groups reestablished in 1999
New Wave of British Heavy Metal musical groups